Richard Ali (born 3 September 1984) is a Nigerian writer, lawyer and co-founder of Parrésia Publishers, a Lagos-based Afri-centric publishing house, home to Helon Habila, Onyeka Nwelue, Chika Unigwe and Abubakar Adam Ibrahim, other continental voices.

Life and career 
Richard was born in Kano, Nigeria, and moved to Jos, Nigeria, in 1988, where he studied up to the end of his secondary school education. He was admitted into the LL.B (Civil Law) programme at the Ahmadu Bello University, Zaria, in 2001 and was called to the bar in 2010 as a barrister and solicitor to the Supreme Court of Nigeria.

In 2003, he was appointed to the editorship of Sardauna Magazine, a Kaduna-based general-interest publication, while still an undergraduate at Ahmadu Bello University. He also served as the Secretary of the National Association of Nigerian Students Committee on Inter-Religious Harmony and Campus Peace from 2003 to 2004. He was Editor-In-Chief of Sentinel Nigeria, a quarterly e-zine, for 14 issues from 2008 to 2013. At the 2011 international convention of the Association of Nigerian Authors, he was elected Publicity Secretary (North) and served for two two-year terms.

In 2011, he co-founded Parrésia Publishers with Azafi Omoluabi-Ogosi, to create a new publishing platform for African voices, and has served as the company's chief operating officer since then. He is a founding member of the Nairobi-based Jalada Writers Cooperative, a board member of Uganda's Babishai Niwe Poetry Foundation and has attended several literary events across the world, including the Frankfurt Book Fair, the Abu Dhabi Book Fair, the Writivism Festival and the Aké Arts and Book Festival and he has served as judge for the 2014 and 2015 BN Poetry Award Competition and Rwanda's Huza Press short stories anthology competition in 2015.

His poetry and short stories have been published widely, including in Jalada, Enkare Review, Saraba Magazine and Okike Journal. He was runner-up in the 2008 John la Rose Short Story Competition.

Ali served as Editor of ANA Review, journal of the Association of Nigerian Authors, from 2013 to 2016.

Works 
Essays

(2015) "Rebel Music and the African Country", published in Jalada Afrofutures, Nairobi.
(2015) "The Age of Buhari – Regicide and the Post Ethnic Youth", published in Mantle, New York.
(2016) "Arabic as a Bridge to the Rest of Africa", published in Jalada.

Publications

(2012) City of Memories, a novel
(2014) ANA Review, ed.
(2015) ANA Review, ed.
(2016) ANA Review, ed.

Criticism

Post Colonial Conflict in Africa: A Study of Richard Ali’s City of Memories

Wandama Wadinga

AFRREV IJAH International Journal of Arts and Humanities, Bahir Dar, Ethiopia.

Symptoms of Trauma in “the Age of Iron”: (Se)Curing the National Psyche in Richard Ali’s City of Memories

Olumide Ogundipe

PhD Dissertation [2014], Department of English and Film Studies, University of Alberta, Canada.

Interviews 
Emmanuel Iduma interviews Richard Ali for The Mantle: Gambit
Bwesigye bwa Mwesigire interviews Richard Ali for This is Africa
Valentina Mmaka Acava interviews Richard Ali for Authors in Africa

References

1984 births
Living people
Ahmadu Bello University alumni
Chief operating officers
21st-century Nigerian lawyers
Nigerian publishers (people)
Nigerian male poets
Nigerian short story writers
Nigerian essayists
Nigerian male novelists
21st-century Nigerian poets
21st-century Nigerian novelists